Gol Khandan (also romanized as Gol Khandān) is a village in Takab Rural District, in the Central District of Dargaz County, Razavi Khorasan Province, Iran. At the 2006 census, its population was 285, in 77 families.

References 

Populated places in Dargaz County